The UCI world championships are annual competitions promoted by the Union Cycliste Internationale (UCI) to determine world champion cyclists. They are held in several different styles of racing, in a different country each year. Championship winners wear a white jersey with coloured bands around the chest for the following year. The similarity to the colours of a rainbow gives them the colloquial name of "the rainbow jersey." The first three individuals or teams in each championship win gold, silver and bronze medals. Former world champions are allowed to wear a trim to their collar and sleeves in the same pattern as the rainbow jersey.

Championships are held for men and for women in road cycling, track cycling, cyclo-cross, mountain biking, gravel, BMX, and indoor cycling. There are also championships for disabled competitors.

History
The first recognised world championships were promoted by the International Cycling Association, a body formed in November 1892 by cycling bodies from Britain, Canada, France, Holland, Italy, Germany and Belgium. The ICA was formed at the initiative of the National Cyclists' Union in Britain. Until then its own championships, open to riders from any country, were considered the unofficial championships of the world. It was because the sport needed world championships independent of any national body that Henry Sturmey of the magazine The Cyclist and later founder of the Sturmey-Archer gear company proposed an International Cyclists Association in 1892.

The first recognised world championship was held in Chicago in 1893, with track races at one mile, 10 kilometres, and a 100 km race in which riders were paced by tandems of up to six riders. An American, Arthur Augustus Zimmerman, won the mile and 10 km races and a South African, Mentjes, won the 100 km.

The 1894 championship in Antwerp were, like Chicago, for amateurs. Lehr, a German, won the mile, Jaap Eden of Holland won the 10 km and Henie of Norway the 100 km.

Professionals raced from 1895, in Cologne, when Jimmy Michael of Britain won the 100 km.

The definition of amateurs and professionals was important for the International Cycling Association, to which the National Cyclists Union would allow only national bodies which shared its own strict definition of amateurism. That definition excluded the main French body, the Union Vélocipèdique Française, which had been allowed to observe the founding meeting but not to vote. French discontent at that exclusion, and that the British insisted on separate votes for England, Wales, Ireland and its colonies, led France and other countries to set up a rival body before the 1900 races. The Union Cycliste Internationale became the world governing body and the International Cycling Association vanished.

Elite World Championships

Current championships
Events are organized in the following disciplines

UCI Road World Championships
UCI Track Cycling World Championships
UCI Mountain Bike World Championships
UCI Mountain Bike Marathon World Championships
UCI Urban Cycling World Championships
UCI Trials World Championships
UCI Cycling Esports World Championships
UCI Cyclo-cross World Championships
UCI Gravel World Championships
UCI BMX World Championships
UCI Indoor Cycling World Championships
UCI Para-cycling Road World Championships
UCI Para-cycling Track World Championships

Defunct championships
 UCI B World Championships

Junior World Championships

Road cycling

1975–2004: part of UCI Road World Championships
2005–2009: part of UCI Juniors World Championships
2010: 2010 UCI Juniors Road World Championships
2011–current: part of UCI Road World Championships

Track cycling

2005–2009: part of UCI Juniors World Championships
2010–current: UCI Juniors Track World Championships

See also

UCI World Cup
World MTB Orienteering Championships
Asian Cycling Championships

References

External links
Union Cycliste Internationale

 
World Championships
 UCI